Lewis H. McKenzie (March 20, 1926 – September 14, 1999) was an American politician. He served as a Democratic member for the 14th district of the Georgia State Senate.

Life and career 
McKenzie was born in DeKalb County, Georgia. He served in the United States Navy for two years. After that, he attended Washington and Lee University.

In 1965, McKenzie was elected to the Montezuma City Council. The next year, he became mayor of Montezuma, Georgia. In 1981, McKenzie was elected to represent the 14th district of the Georgia State Senate, succeeding Hugh Carter. He served until 1990.

McKenzie died on September 14, 1999, at the age of 73.

References 

1926 births
1999 deaths
People from DeKalb County, Georgia
Democratic Party Georgia (U.S. state) state senators
20th-century American politicians
Washington and Lee University alumni
Mayors of places in Georgia (U.S. state)